Lovers' Lane Halt railway station was a minor railway station or halt in north Devon close to the town of Appledore, a community lying on the peninsula formed by the sea (Barnstaple Bay), the River Torridge, and the River Taw.

History 
The halt was opened in 1908. The line had until 1901 run only as far as Northam.

Lovers' Lane had a simple single platform, raised one foot above rail level, without any shelter and without lighting. It had no freight facilities. It was at the road junction with the Mount (0.3 miles from Watertown) with steps running down towards the lifeboat station.

The station had a short life, closing in March 1917. The trackbed from Appledore to Richmond Road Halt was converted into a road and the platform removed in the process.

See also

 Northam station
 Westward Ho! station
 Appledore station

References 
Notes

Sources
Baxter, Julia & Jonathan (1980). The Bideford, Westward Ho! and Appledore railway 1901–1917. Pub. Chard. .
Garner, Rod (2008). The Bideford, Westward Ho! & Appledore Railway. Pub. Kestrel Railway Books. .
Jenkins, Stanley C. (1993). The Bideford, Westward Ho! and Appledore Railway. Oxford : Oakwood Press. .
Stuckey, Douglas (1962). The Bideford, Westward Ho! and Appledore Railway 1901–1917. Pub. West Country Publications.

Disused railway stations in Devon
Former Bideford, Westward Ho! and Appledore Railway stations
Railway stations in Great Britain opened in 1908
Railway stations in Great Britain closed in 1917
1908 establishments in England
Torridge District